The National Railway Administration (NRA) is the national railway regulator of China. It is part of the Ministry of Transport of the People's Republic of China. In 2013, the State Council of China broke up the Ministry of Railways and separated the functions of railway operation and regulation. The China Railway Corporation was created to operate the railway network, while the National Railway Administration was created to regulate and oversee the corporation, with safety and accident prevention being a major part of its function.

The NRA oversees the largest railway network in Asia and the largest high-speed railway network in the world. The densities of the network's passenger and freight transport are among the world's highest. It has seven regional oversight bureaus, based in Shenyang, Shanghai, Guangzhou, Chengdu, Wuhan, Xi'an, and Lanzhou, respectively, which oversee 18 regional railway companies (formerly regional bureaus) of the China Railway Corporation.

In March 2013, Lu Dongfu (陆东福) was appointed the first director of the NRA. He was replaced by Yang Yudong (杨宇栋) in 2016. They both concurrently served as vice minister of transport.

References

External links

2013 establishments in China
Railway
Rail transport in China